The Waltz Queen was an LP album by Patti Page, released by Mercury Records in 1958 under its Wing Records subsidiary, catalog numbers MGW-12121 (monaural) and SRW-16121 (stereophonic). It should not be confused with an album of the same name released by Mercury in 1955 under catalog numbers MG-20049 and SR-60049. It was issued in two versions, one with 12 tracks and one with only 10.  The album was reissued with a similar cover as simply Patti Page because of the confusion in using the same title as a popular full-priced release by the label's top star. The stereo version didn't involve much stereo, as almost all the tracks originated as mono singles. One exception was "Born to Be With You," intended for a single release which never took place.

Vic Schoen and his Orchestra provided the musical accompaniment. He was also the musical director, recording supervisor and engineer.

Track listing

1958 albums
Patti Page albums
Wing Records albums